Andrew Wyllie was the manager of Reading Football Club, England between 1926 and 1931.

References

Year of birth missing
Year of death missing
Reading F.C. managers
English Football League managers